John Vanderslice (born May 22, 1967 in Gainesville, Florida) is an American musician, songwriter, record producer, and recording engineer. He is the owner and founder of Tiny Telephone, an analog recording studio with locations in San Francisco Mission District and North Oakland. He released 10 full-length albums and 5 remix records and EPs on Dead Oceans and Barsuk Records and has collaborated with musicians such as The Mountain Goats, St. Vincent, and Spoon.

Since 2014, Vanderslice has been a full-time record producer at Tiny Telephone and has worked with Frog Eyes, Samantha Crain, the Mountain Goats, and Grandaddy. He has previously worked with Sophie Hunger, Bombadil, Strand Of Oaks and Spoon.

Early years
Vanderslice grew up in rural North Florida before his family moved to Maryland when he was 11. In 1989, he graduated with a degree in economics from the University of Maryland, where he also studied art history. Vanderslice moved to San Francisco in 1990. While supporting himself as a waiter, Vanderslice took classes at University of California, Berkeley, with the intention of becoming an English teacher. Vanderslice then spent five years as a member of the experimental band Mk Ultra, with whom he released three albums in the 1990s. The last of these, The Dream Is Over, received a 9.2 from Pitchfork.

In 1997, he founded Tiny Telephone, a 3,000 sq. ft., two-room recording studio in the Mission District of San Francisco. The studio was initially used as a rehearsal space before being developed as a full-time, all-analog recording studio. Bands who have recorded in the studio include Death Cab for Cutie, Sleater-Kinney, Okkervil River, Deerhoof, The Mountain Goats, The Magnetic Fields, Tune-yards, and Spoon. He opened Tiny Telephone's Oakland studio in late 2015.

Solo career
In 2000, Vanderslice released his first solo album, Mass Suicide Occult Figurines, and briefly gained some national media attention for the single "Bill Gates Must Die" after concocting a hoax in which Microsoft supposedly threatened legal action over the song;  Vanderslice had trouble manufacturing the CD because the artwork resembled that of a Windows installation disc, and at least one manufacturer was wary of legal action. During the controversy, he was interviewed by Spin, Wired, and the San Francisco Chronicle.        

Time Travel Is Lonely and Life and Death of an American Fourtracker followed in 2001 and 2002 respectively, followed by 2004’s Cellar Door.

Many songs on the 2005 album Pixel Revolt referenced the September 11, 2001 attacks and the Iraq War and were more overtly political in their lyrical content. The album earned an 8.3 rating on Pitchfork and was cited for its "meticulous arrangements" with "everything in its right place", and declared an "excellent album". The album's ending resolves the narrator's struggles with acute depression ("Dead Slate Pacific") and suicidal thoughts ("The Golden Gate") with a love song to psychotropic drugs ("CRC 7173, Affectionately").

The title of Vanderslice's 2007 album, Emerald City, references both the nickname of the fortified Green Zone in Baghdad and the name of the city in The Wizard of Oz. He has said about the album: "I was so beaten down after the 2000 election and after 9/11 and then the invasion of Iraq, Afghanistan; I was so depleted as a person after all that stuff happened, that I had to write my way out of it. I really had to write political songs because for me it is a way of making sense and processing what is going on." Emerald City achieved a score of 82/100 on Metacritic. Entertainment Weekly called the album "a gleaming gem" that doesn't disappoint. Billboard'''s review of the record called Vanderslice an "always perceptive lyricist". Calling Vanderslice a "master story-teller", Matt Fink of Paste said that Emerald City was "vividly imagined yet subtle in tone, with conflicted character sketches unfolding around somber synth melodies, creaky electronic effects, and fuzzy acoustic guitar strums."

In 2009, with Romanian Names, Vanderslice broke away from overtly political lyrical content characteristic of previous albums and turned his focus to personal reflections on romance and a modern person’s relationship to the natural landscape. Maintaining his commitment to fully analog production, Vanderslice recorded guitar and piano tracks for this album in his analog basement studio of his San Francisco home. He completed further instrumentation and production at his own Tiny Telephone recording studio with producer Scott Solter.

In 2010, Vanderslice released a free EP called Green Grow The Rushes.

A full album, White Wilderness, was released on January 25, 2011, on Dead Oceans. Here, Vanderslice forwent his usual meticulous process of manipulating and heavily over-dubbing tracks in the recording studio, in favor a pared-down production style. He recorded the album live with Minna Choi and the 19-member Magik*Magik Orchestra, the house orchestra of Tiny Telephone, in three days at Berkeley’s historically-renowned Fantasy Studios. Vanderslice wrote acoustic versions of each song, while Choi wrote all orchestral arrangements. The collaboration resulted in a looser sound that maintained the structural complexity and pop sensibility of Vanderslice’s previous songwriting. Lyrically, Vanderslice reflects on his trajectory as a musician and performer and draws inspiration from the California landscape. "The Piano Lesson" recounts early memories of learning to play the piano as a child, while "After It Ends" imagines a performer destroying and escaping his venue at the end of a show. The romping "Convict Lake" is an autobiographical account of an overdose on LSD during a camping trip at this Sierra Nevada, California, lake. It was produced and recorded by John Congleton.

In January 2012, Vanderslice left his record contract with Dead Oceans. He created a Kickstarter campaign to raise funds to start his own label and reached his $18,500 goal within hours of starting the campaign, which ultimately resulted in his ninth album, Dagger Beach. 

With Dagger Beach, Vanderslice pushed experimentation with analog production techniques to the forefront of his songwriting. For some songs, including "Harlequin Press" and "Damage Control", he tried to avoid familiar song structures by writing over improvised drum parts played by longtime collaborator Jason Slota. On the album, Vanderslice revisits the theme of navigating the California landscape as a metaphor for personal relationships: “Raw Wood” reflects on solo camping in Wildcat camp of Point Reyes National Park, while “North Coast Rep” describes a disintegrating friendship by way of a found photograph of the Sonoma, California, landscape.

In conjunction with Dagger Beach, Vanderslice released his own full cover version of David Bowie's Diamond Dogs. The idea for the cover album came in August 2012, when Vanderslice performed Diamond Dogs in full at the Vogue Theater in San Francisco, followed by a screening of Michel Gondry's cult classic, The Science of Sleep. After intensive rehearsing for a single show with a limited audience, Vanderslice decided to channel his creative efforts with Bowie's original material into an entire cover version of the album. It was released on limited edition vinyl in June 2013. Using the original album as a backbone to experiment and improvise in the recording studio with collaborators, Vanderslice altered lyrics, song structures, chord progressions, and titles of many of the songs.

With full control of the production and distribution of his self-released albums and a commitment to quality control, Vanderslice had both Dagger Beach and Diamond Dogs pressed on 200-gram vinyl by audiophile Quality Record Pressings plant. In response to widespread music file sharing and in an effort to control sound quality of distributed files, he has made high-quality music files of many self-released songs freely available online.

In an interview with The New Yorker, Vanderslice stated that a near-death experience in 2014, in which the van he was touring in almost flipped on Interstate 80 in Ohio, prompted him to quit touring and making records. Surviving the incident was a life-altering experience: “After that happened, maybe a second later, I was like, I’m done. I don’t want to die in a van. It wasn’t sad, it wasn’t celebratory. It was just like, eh, I had a good run.”

Recording technique and collaborations
Vanderslice is a proponent of using analog instruments and recording equipment to produce a richer, more raw sound, which he has sometimes called "sloppy hi-fi". He has collaborated closely with engineer/producers in the production of his albums, including John Congleton, Scott Solter, and John Croslin.

Vanderslice was a contributing producer on the Spoon album, Gimme Fiction, and also produced The Mountain Goats albums We Shall All Be Healed, The Sunset Tree, and Heretic Pride.  In March and April 2009, he toured alongside The Mountain Goats' John Darnielle in the "Gone Primitive Tour". These shows featured Vanderslice and Darnielle each playing acoustic sets and then performing material together.

On several occasions, Vanderslice has chosen bands to tour with him who have gone on to widespread recognition and critical respect, including Sufjan Stevens, Okkervil River, The Tallest Man On Earth, and St. Vincent.

Influences and interests
Vanderslice is influenced by film and is a fan of David Lynch, whose work is referenced in his song "Promising Actress". He is a prolific amateur photographer, and has taken publicity photos for Thao Nguyen, The Mountain Goats, Will Sheff of Okkervil River, and Mirah. He has also had his work used as album artwork by Matt Nathanson, Carey Mercer of Frog Eyes, and Mobius Band, as well as for his own 2009 release, Romanian Names.

Discography

AlbumsMass Suicide Occult Figurines (2000)Time Travel Is Lonely (2001)Life and Death of an American Fourtracker (2002)Cellar Door (2004)Pixel Revolt (2005)Emerald City (2007)Romanian Names (2009)White Wilderness (recorded with The Magik*Magik Orchestra) (2011)Dagger Beach (2013)Vanderslice Plays Diamond Dogs (2013)The Cedars (2019)Dollar Hits (2020)ETHICAL JUTE MOUSE: Lost Songs From Tiny Telephone 2001-2021 (2021)John, I can't believe civilization is still going here in 2021! Congratulations to all of us. Love, DCB (2021)d E A T h ~ b U g (2021)Released Under Creative Commons (2022)

Remix albumsMGM Endings: Cellar Door Remixes (2004)Suddenly It All Went Dark: Pixel Revolt Live to 2-Track (2006)Scott Solter Remixes Pixel Revolt in Analog (2007)

Singles/EPsBedside recordings vol. 1.2 - 7" (with the Mountain Goats) (Barsuk, 2003)Moon Colony Bloodbath - vinyl EP (with the Mountain Goats) (2009)Too Much Time - 7" (Dead Oceans, 2009)D.I.A.L.O. - 7" (Dead Oceans, 2010)Green Grow The Rushes - (2010)Song For Clay Miller - Flexi (The Native Sound, 2013)Midnight Blue - Flexi (The Native Sound, 2015)Spectral Dawn - (Native Cat, 2019)eeeeeeep! (2020)Amethyst'' (2022)

References

External links

 JohnVanderslice.com
 Tiny Telephone Recording
 John Vanderslice's Tumblr
 John Vanderslice at NPR
 John Vanderslice's Radiohead cover on Stereogum
 Daytrotter Session
 Pitchfork Feature: Top CDRs Given To Me At Shows
The Magik*Magik Orchestra
Dead Oceans Page

1967 births
Living people
American rock guitarists
American male guitarists
Singers from Florida
Musicians from Gainesville, Florida
Mission District, San Francisco
20th-century American male singers
20th-century American singers
21st-century American male singers
21st-century American singers
20th-century American guitarists
21st-century American guitarists
Guitarists from Florida
20th-century American male musicians
Dead Oceans artists
Barsuk Records artists